Pyroderces longalitella is a moth in the family Cosmopterigidae. It is found on the Seychelles.

References

Natural History Museum Lepidoptera generic names catalog

longalitella
Moths described in 1966